Straumvatnet is a lake that lies in the municipality of Sørfold in Nordland county, Norway. The lake is located on the southeast side of the village of Straumen. Straumvatnet empties into the Sørfolda fjord.

See also
 List of lakes in Norway
 Geography of Norway

References

Sørfold
Lakes of Nordland